American Ninja Warrior (sometimes abbreviated as ANW) is an American sports entertainment reality show based on the Japanese television reality show Sasuke. It features thousands of competitors attempting to complete series of obstacle courses of increasing difficulty in various cities across the United States, in hopes of advancing to the national finals on the Las Vegas Strip and becoming the season's "American Ninja Warrior".

To date, only Geoff Britten, Isaac Caldiero, and Drew Drechsel have conquered Mount Midoriyama and achieved Total Victory. Caldiero and Drechsel are the only competitors to win the cash prize of $1,000,000. Britten was awarded the title of "First American Ninja Warrior" for being the first to complete all six courses (city qualifying, city finals, and four stages of Mount Midoriyama) in a single season.The series premiered on December 12, 2009 on cable channel G4, and now airs on NBC.

History

In late 2006, the American cable channel G4 began airing broadcasts (subtitled in English or dubbed with English commentary and re-titled Ninja Warrior) of the Japanese sports entertainment television special Sasuke. Coinciding with this, the channel held the first American Ninja Challenge, in which Americans gained the opportunity to be sent to compete on Sasuke. Over time, the semi-annual Sasuke broadcasts on G4 gained a cult following in the United States and eventually became some of the channel's most-watched broadcasts. This led to the creation of the American adaptation of the show, American Ninja Warrior, in 2009. American Ninja Warrior followed American Ninja Challenge as the qualifying route for Americans to enter Sasuke.

Since the fourth season, American finalists compete on a nearly-identical finals course on the Las Vegas Strip instead of traveling to Japan to compete on Sasuke. NBC began broadcasting the city finals and national finals episodes in the fourth season.

By the fifth season, G4 was set to be replaced by Esquire Network and had wound down all original programming—besides American Ninja Warrior—by January 2013. Notably, the sideboard advertising along the fifth season's courses listed Esquire Network as the broadcaster because G4 was going to transition into Esquire Network by April 22, 2013—prior to the season premiere. However, the channel switch was delayed to September 23, 2013, and Esquire Network took over Style Network's channel space instead. As a result, NBC became the sole broadcaster of the original episodes while Esquire Network aired reruns until the eighth season.

Series overview

Presenters

During each episode, the play-by-play announcer and color commentator provide play-by-play on a competitor's run on the course while the sideline reporter introduces the obstacles during the beginning of the episode and interviews competitors.

American Ninja Warrior was originally hosted by G4's Blair Herter and Alison Haislip.

In the second season, comedian and television host Matt Iseman joined the show, replacing Herter. Producers were fond of his knowledge of sports and lighthearted, enthusiastic delivery. Additionally, MMA fighter Jimmy Smith was brought in as co-host while Haislip was assigned to the new sideline reporter position. The panel remained the same throughout season three.

For season four, Olympic medalist Jonny Moseley was brought in as the new color commentator, replacing Smith. Producers believed his experience as a freestyle skier would bring a unique perspective to the series. Meanwhile, sportscaster and television presenter Angela Sun replaced Haislip.

For season five, two newcomers were introduced. Sports analyst and former NFL player Akbar Gbaja-Biamila replaced Moseley, while ESPN sportscaster and model Jenn Brown replaced Sun as sideline reporter. Gbaja-Biamila was contacted to audition for the role of co-host in Los Angeles after being seen on the NFL Network by one of the series' executive producers. The season five panel remained the same through the sixth season.

For season seven, CBS Sports reporter Kristine Leahy joined the show as the new sideline reporter, replacing Brown, and remained on the show through season 10.

Iseman and Gbaja-Biamila returned to host the eleventh season along with new sideline reporter Zuri Hall.
For season 12, the panel remained the same, as it will for the thirteenth season.

Format

Contestant eligibility

Before being eligible to compete, all contestants must first meet a number of requirements. Some of the requirements are; (1). Contestants must be legal residents of the United States. (2). Contestants must be in good health and capable of participating in strenuous athletic activities. (3). There is no maximum age limit, but contestants must be at least 19 years of age to apply (21 years old during the first nine seasons). Starting in Season 13 the producers asked specific teens ages 15–18 to submit a video to be on the show. (4). Contestants must fill out a 20-question questionnaire and make a video about themselves. Video length requirements have varied from two to eight minutes, depending on the season. (It is currently two to three minutes).

About 1,000 people applied to compete in the first season, 3,500 in the fifth season, 5,000 in the sixth season, 50,000 in the seventh season, 70,000 in the eighth season, and 77,000 in the ninth season. Producers then select 100 contestants from the thousands of applicants to participate in each regional qualifier. Until Season 11, applicants could also camp outside a qualifying course and wait days or weeks to be one of the 10-30 participants selected as "walk-ons." Beginning in Season 11, a lottery system was instituted to randomly select 15-20 'walk-ons' per qualifier location.

City Qualifying and Finals
City Qualifying and Finals courses are filmed back-to-back, usually over two nights.

City Qualifying

In each city qualifying course, the competitors that the producers have selected compete on an obstacle course consisting of six obstacles.

At the beginning of each run, a buzzer sounds off and a timer begins, allowing a competitor to start the course. The first obstacle on any city qualifying course is the Quintuple Steps, Quad Steps, Floating Steps, or Shrinking Steps which competitors must run across. This is followed by four different obstacles that test a competitor's balance, upper-body strength, and grip. These five obstacles are built above water (although the balance obstacles were built above a safety mat until season 8). If a competitor falls into the water or touches it, their run ends immediately and the timer records their time.

In the first seven seasons, the sixth and final obstacle was the 14-foot Warped Wall, in which competitors were given three chances to reach the top. In the eighth and ninth seasons, the wall was 14'6". In the tenth season, the 18-foot "Mega Wall" was introduced adjacent to the Warped Wall. Competitors had only one attempt to reach the top of the Mega Wall and, if successful, they won $10,000. In the eleventh season, competitors choosing the Mega Wall who failed on their first attempt could earn $5,000 on their second attempt and $2,500 on their third if they were successful on, respectively, their second or third attempts. Competitors are given the choice of which to climb.

At the top of both walls, a competitor presses a buzzer that stops the timer and records their time, ending their run on the course. The top 30 competitors who go the farthest in the least amount of time advance to the city finals course. Since the fifth season, competitors who complete the city qualifiers automatically move on to the city finals. Since the ninth season, the top five women also advance to the city finals, even if they have not finished in the top 30.

City Finals

City finals courses are the follow-up to each city qualifying course. They contain four new obstacles in addition to the six obstacles featured in the city qualifying course. These four obstacles are all placed after the original six obstacles. In the tenth season, two of the original six obstacles are replaced with new obstacles for the city finals course, but this was dropped in season eleven.

The top 15 or 12 competitors who go the farthest in the least amount of time from each city finals course move on to compete on the National Finals course. Since the fifth season, competitors who complete the city finals automatically move on to the National Finals. Since the ninth season, the top two women in each city finals course also move on to compete on the National Finals course, even if they do not finish in the top 15 or 12. Previously, many women had been granted "wildcard" slots, which allowed them to advance to the National Finals. Since the eighth season, small prizes ranging from $1,000 to $5,000 are awarded to first, second, and third finishers who complete the city finals course.

In the first three seasons, there was a semi-finals course in between the city finals and the National Finals courses, where the top 15 competitors from the city finals course were narrowed down to 10 and then sent to Japan to compete on Sasuke. In the second and third seasons, this was referred to as "boot camp" and took place at a summer camp in Simi Valley, California. During this time, competitors trained together for multiple days and took part in pressure challenges. With the expansion of the series in its fourth season, there was no longer a need to narrow down competitors to 10, as they were no longer being sent to Japan, and this semi-finals course was removed.

Obstacles

Obstacles are designed and produced in the five months prior to an episode taping. In the fourth season, each location contained one or two obstacles that differed between other locations. Since the fifth season, three to five obstacles have differed. In the eighth season, 18 obstacles were debuted. In the tenth season, the show's first underwater obstacle was introduced during Stage 2 of the National Finals.

Beginning with the ninth season, fans of the show have been given the opportunity to design their own obstacles through the ANW Obstacle Design Challenge. Seven fan-submitted obstacles have been featured on the series thus far.

National Finals
In the first three seasons, the top 10 ANW competitors advanced to a Sasuke finals course in Japan. Since season four (except for season twelve), ANW has had a finals course on the Las Vegas Strip known as "Mount Midoriyama." The National Finals course consists of four stages, each containing obstacles of increasing difficulty. The course is about the same size as four football fields and contains 23 obstacles.

Stage 1 consists of eight obstacles, which test the competitors' agility and speed. The first stage is timed, and only the competitors who successfully complete it within 2:35 advance to Stage 2.

Stage 2 contains six obstacles that test competitors' strength and speed. Competitors must complete the course within a time limit in order to advance to Stage 3. The time limit through the first nine seasons was 4:00. In the tenth season, the time limit was increased by 30 seconds.

Stage 3 consists of eight obstacles that test competitors' upper body and grip strength. It is the only stage in the National Finals that has no time limit. Like Stages 1 and 2, only the competitors who successfully complete Stage 3 move on to compete on Stage 4. Starting in Season 10, Stage 3 has a clock that counts up to determine any tiebreaking times should no contestant advance from Stage 3, since the format guarantees prize money to the contestant that advances the furthest on the course, and the tiebreaker is based on how fast the contestants reached the previous obstacle prior to failing.

Stage 4 contains the final obstacle of the National Finals courses—a rope climb. Competitors must complete this rope climb in :30 or less in order to be crowned as "American Ninja Warrior." The rope climb's height was 50 feet from the first through third seasons, and was increased to 65 feet in the fourth season. It has been increased since to 75 feet.

Prize money
Aside from the first season, if a competitor completes all four stages of the National Finals, they receive a cash prize. In the second season, the prize money was $250,000. In the third season, the prize was an endorsement deal with K-Swiss worth $500,000 and to become the face of a national advertisement campaign for the company as well as G4. In the fourth, fifth, and sixth seasons, the cash prize was $500,000. From the seventh to eleventh season, the cash prize has been $1,000,000.

From the second through seventh seasons, the fastest competitor to beat the final stage would receive the full prize money, regardless of whether other competitors completed Stage 4 as well. Beginning with the eighth season, if multiple competitors completed Stage 4, the competitors split the prize money.

Starting in the tenth season, a guaranteed $100,000 cash prize is offered, without regard of a player finishing all four stages. The player who advances the furthest on the course in the fastest time is declared the "Last Ninja Standing," and wins the prize. If any competitor finishes all four stages, the prize money is augmented to $1,000,000. If one competitor finishes Stage 4, he wins the entirety of the augmented prize. If multiple competitors completed Stage 4, the prize money is split among competitors that finished Stage 4, with the fastest competitor still declared the overall champion.

Season synopses

2009–2011
The first season of American Ninja Warrior began production in July 2009. The season premiered on December 12, 2009, on G4, and concluded on December 19, 2009. It consisted of eight half-hour episodes. The qualifying and semifinals rounds took place in Venice Beach, where a tryout was opened, meaning, competitors from across the United States had to fly themselves there to compete. Levi Meeuwenberg was the Last Man Standing, having gone the farthest in the least amount of time among the American competitors on Sasuke 23.

The second season premiered on December 8, 2010, on G4, and concluded on December 23, 2010, after 10 hour-long episodes. Qualifying and semifinals were held in Venice Beach in August. Out of the 10 competitors sent to Japan to compete on Sasuke 26, five completed Stage 1, four completed Stage 2, while none completed Stage 3. David Campbell was the Last Man Standing, having been the American gone the farthest in the least amount of time on Stage 3.

The third season had the same format as the second season but aired in the summer. Qualifying and semifinals were held in Venice Beach in May. It premiered on July 31, 2011, on G4, and concluded on August 21, 2011. The finale was aired again on August 22, 2011, as a two-hour primetime special on NBC. In addition to the 10 Americans sent to compete on Sasuke, one fan of ANW got the chance to compete as well. This was the result of an eBay auction in which proceeds were sent to the American Red Cross to help with recovery efforts following the 2011 Tōhoku earthquake and tsunami in Japan. During Sasuke 27, four of the six competitors who reached Stage 3 were American—a new record. Previously, only one American would reach Stage 3 per Sasuke competition. David Campbell was again the Last Man Standing, having gone the farthest in the least amount of time among the American competitors on Stage 3.

2012–2015

The fourth season was notable for differentiating American Ninja Warrior from Sasuke and began what is known as "the modern era" of the series. Following the ratings success of the third season's NBC primetime special, the fourth season aired on both G4 and NBC. It premiered on May 20, 2012, on G4, and concluded on July 23, 2012, on NBC. Regional qualifying was aired on G4, while the regional finals courses aired on NBC. With an increased production budget, preliminary rounds were held in three locations across the United States. Six regional competitions (Southwest, Midwest, Northeast, Northwest, Mid-South, and Southeast) took place in Venice Beach, Dallas, and Miami. During the National Finals, which were held for the first time in Las Vegas, Brent Steffensen was the only competitor to reach Stage 3 and became the Last Man Standing. He went further on Stage 3 than any American had ever gone before—including on Sasuke.

The fifth season premiered on June 30, 2013, on G4, and concluded on September 16, 2013, on NBC. City qualifying and finals courses aired on both G4 and NBC. City competitions were held in four locations: Venice Beach, Baltimore, Miami, and Denver. During Venice Beach Qualifying, Jessie Graff became the first woman to qualify for a city finals course. During the National Finals, 41-year-old Joyce Shahboz became the first woman to compete there twice in two years (as a wild card), while Brian Arnold fell on the final obstacle of Stage 3 and won the title of Last Man Standing.

The sixth season premiered on May 26, 2014, and concluded on September 8, 2014, with original episodes airing solely on NBC. City competitions were held in five locations: Venice Beach, Dallas, St. Louis, Miami, and Denver. During Dallas Qualifying, Kacy Catanzaro became the first female competitor to make it up the Warped Wall. Later in the Dallas Finals, she became the first woman to complete a city finals course. Catanzaro's two runs have been described as the first "viral moment" of the show and are credited with increasing the seventh season's submissions ten times over. During the National Finals, Joe Moravsky fell on the antepenultimate obstacle of Stage 3 and became the sixth season's Last Man Standing.

The seventh season premiered on May 25, 2015, and ended on September 14, 2015. City competitions were held in six locations: Venice Beach, Kansas City, Houston, Orlando, and Pittsburgh, and San Pedro, where a special military edition was held for competitors who are either current or former members of the U.S. Armed Forces. During the National Finals, a record of 38 competitors completed Stage 1, and 8 athletes completed Stage 2, and both Isaac Caldiero and Geoff Britten completed Stage 3, marking the first time any competitor(s) completed it in the regular season. During Stage 4, Britten completed the rope climb in 0:29.65 seconds, earning the title of "First American Ninja Warrior" for being the first to complete all six courses (city qualifying, city finals, and four stages of Mount Midoriyama) in a single season, and Caldiero completed the rope climb in 0:26.14 seconds, earning the title of "Second American Ninja Warrior" and the $1,000,000 prize due to him having the fastest time.

2016–2019

The eighth season of the series began on June 1, 2016, and concluded on September 12, 2016. The eighth season marked a 40 percent increase in the number of female submission videos from the previous season. City competitions were held in Los Angeles, Atlanta, Indianapolis, Oklahoma City, and Philadelphia. During the Philadelphia finals, no competitor completed the course—a first in the series' history. In Stage 1 of the National Finals, many veterans of the show, including Ryan Stratis, Brent Steffensen, Travis Rosen, James McGrath, Jamie Rahn, Mike Bernardo, Kevin Bull, Ian Dory, Jojo Bynum, and Geoff Britten, did not complete the course. As a result, only 17 competitors advanced to Stage 2—the lowest in the series' history. However, Jessie Graff became the first woman to complete Stage 1, placing fifth. Only two athletes: Drew Drechsel and Daniel Gil managed to beat Stage 2, but none of them completed Stage 3. Daniel Gil fell on the Ultimate Cliffhanger, while Drew fell further on the Hang Climb and was declared the Last Man Standing.

The ninth season premiered on June 12, 2017, and ended on September 18, 2017. City competitions were held in Los Angeles, San Antonio, Daytona Beach, Kansas City, Cleveland, and Denver. A record of 41 competitors successfully completed Stage 1 during the National Finals, including David Campbell, Ryan Stratis, Drew Drechsel, and Allyssa Beird, who became just the second woman to complete it. Stage 2 saw every competitor eliminated except Joe Moravsky, Sean Bryan, and Najee Richardson. However, none of them could complete Stage 3. Bryan and Richardson fell on the Ultimate Cliffhanger, while Moravsky fell on the penultimate obstacle and became the Last Man Standing.

The tenth season began airing on May 30, 2018, and ended on September 10, 2018. City competitions were held in Los Angeles, Dallas, Miami, Indianapolis, Philadelphia, and Minneapolis. In one episode, they did a Jurassic World night and showed a sneak peek of Jurassic World: Fallen Kingdom. Drew Drechsel and Sean Bryan—the two competitors to reach Stage 3 of the National Finals—both fell during their runs. However, Drechsel fell at a faster time than Bryan, crowning him the Last Ninja Standing. As the result of a format change introduced this season, Drechsel was also the first Last Ninja Standing to win $100,000 for being the competitor who went the farthest in the least amount of time on the National Finals course but did not complete Stage 4.

The eleventh season started its premiere on May 29, 2019, and ended on September 16, 2019. City competitions were held in Los Angeles, Atlanta, Oklahoma City, Seattle/Tacoma, marking the first time that a course was held in the Pacific Northwest, Baltimore, and Cincinnati. In one episode, they did Angry Birds obstacles in honor of Angry Birds Movie 2. New rules regarding the Mega Wall obstacle, which was introduced in the previous season, came into effect. Competitors were given three chances to make it up the wall, but the prize money decreased after each attempt, starting at $10,000, then decreasing to $5,000, and finally $2,500. This season also introduced the Power Tower, where the top two finishers from each city qualifying would race on a giant metal structure to gain the "Speed Pass", which guaranteed them a spot in the National Finals. In City Finals, the Power Tower was modified, and the top two finishers would race for the "Safety Pass", which allowed them to rerun the course in either one of the first two stages (Stage 1 or Stage 2) if they fail. During the National Finals, 28 of the 86 finalists completed Stage 1, and a record 21 astounding athletes completed Stage 2, and both Drew Drechsel and Daniel Gil completed Stage 3. Daniel Gil was not able to complete the rope climb on Stage 4 in the 30-second time limit, but Drew Drechsel was able to climb it in 0:27.46 seconds, earning him the title of "Third American Ninja Warrior" and the $1,000,000 prize.

2020–present
On January 22, 2020, the series was renewed for a twelfth season, which premiered on September 7, 2020. For the first time, a Spanish-language version airs on Telemundo. Qualifying cities originally included returns to Los Angeles and St. Louis with a new location, Washington, D.C., with the National Finals initially set to be held again held in Las Vegas. Production of the season was postponed due to the COVID-19 pandemic with filming interrupted in the middle of production on the show, just a day before it was set to begin. On August 12, 2020, it was announced that the season would premiere on September 7. The season, consisting of eight episodes, was filmed at The Dome at America's Center in St. Louis, Missouri; ANW was the first NBC series to have completed a full season of episodes during the current pandemic.

The thirteenth season consists of 12 episodes aired from May 31 to September 13, 2021. The season format has the filming of 5 qualifying episodes in the Tacoma Dome in Seattle/Tacoma, with the 4 semifinals will be taped at Universal Studios Hollywood in Los Angeles. The top 30 competitors and the top 5 women from each qualifying advance to the semifinals. The top 15 competitors and the top 3 women from each semifinals will advance to the National Finals at Mount Midoriyama in Las Vegas. Starting this season, the age limit was lowered to 15 years old.

The fourteenth season premiered on June 6, 2022. The season format is similar to the previous season, but the filming of 5 qualifying episodes was moved to the Alamodome in San Antonio, with the 4 semifinals will be taped at Universal Studios Hollywood in Los Angeles. The top 30 competitors and the top 5 women from each qualifying advance to semifinals. The top 15 competitors and the top 3 women from each semifinals will advance to the National Finals at Mount Midoriyama in Las Vegas.

Special episodes

USA vs. The World

NBC has aired a series of seven international competitions in which an American Ninja Warrior team from the United States compete against teams from other countries around the world, including Japan, Europe, Latin America, Asia, and Australia for bragging rights and the American Ninja Warrior: USA vs. The World trophy. The competitors race on the same Mount Midoriyama course used in the National Finals on the Las Vegas Strip.

All of the international competitions have been hosted by Matt Iseman and Akbar Gbaja-Biamila. The first two included sideline reporter Jenn Brown. The next four included Kristine Leahy as the sideline reporter. The seventh included Zuri Hall as the sideline reporter.

The first international showdown was called USA vs. Japan, while the rest were named USA vs. The World. The first global competition aired on January 13, 2014, and was won by Team USA. The second global competition aired on September 15, 2014, and was won by Team Europe. The third global competition aired on January 31, 2016, and was won by Team USA. The fourth global competition was aired on June 4, 2017, and was again won by Team USA. The fifth global competition aired on March 11, 2018, and was won by Team Europe. The sixth global competition aired on January 27, 2019. For the first time, each team had at least one female competitor. It was won by Team USA. The seventh global competition aired on January 26, 2020, and was won by Team Australia.

All-Stars

2016
On May 29, 2016, prior to the premiere of season eight, NBC aired a two-hour all-stars special in which hosts Matt Iseman and Akbar Gbaja-Biamila chose their own all-star teams composed of three veterans, one rookie, and one woman. Teams competed on Stages 2, 3, and 4 of the regular season finals course, Mt. Midoriyama, as well as competitions on a supersized course that tested their skills in competitions on the Giant Pegboard, Supersonic Shelf Grab, Super Salmon Ladder, and Giant Jump Hang, concluding with a race to the top of the Mega Wall.

2017
On February 20, 2017, NBC aired a second two-hour all-stars special. Like the previous year's competition, ANW hosts Matt Iseman and Akbar Gbaja-Biamila chose their own all-star teams, this year composed of one veteran, one breakout star, and one woman. Team Matt featured Chris Wilczewski, Najee Richardson, and Jesse "Flex" Lebreck. Team Akbar featured Grant McCartney, Neil "Crazy" Craver, and Meagan Martin. Sideline interviewer Kristine Leahy picked her team, which consisted of Jessie Graff, Flip Rodriguez, and Nicholas Coolridge. Teams competed in a relay race to finish sections of Stages 1, 2, and 3 of the regular season finals course, Mt. Midoriyama. Next came the skills competition on a supersized course, where contestants tested their skills in competition on the 75-feet tall Endless Invisible Climb, the 4-story high Super Salmon Ladder, Striding Steps, Big Air Grab, Mega Wall, now 20 feet high, Thunderbolt, and Supersonic Shelf Grab.

2018
On May 17, 2018, NBC aired a third two-hour all-stars special. Like the last two seasons' competition, ANW hosts Matt Iseman and Akbar Gbaja-Biamila, along with Kristine Leahy, chose their all-star teams composed of two male veterans and one female veteran. The reigning champs, Team Kristine (gray/pink), featured: Jessie Graff, Flip Rodriguez, and JJ Woods. Team Matt (blue) featured: Jamie Rahn, Lance Pekus, and Jesse Labreck. Team Akbar featured first-time all-stars: Allyssa Beird, Jon Alexis Jr., and Tyler Yamauchi, as well as competitions on a supersized course that tested their skills in competitions, which consisted of climbing the Super Salmon Ladder, 4 stories high in the fastest time, a speed and balance challenge on the Striding Steps, an upper body test on the Thunderbolt, the Wicked Wingnuts, and a new obstacle, the Mega Spider Climb, where eight women all-stars raced side-by-side 80 feet up to the top of the Stage 4 tower.

2019
The fourth all-stars special aired on May 26, 2019, on NBC, prior to the eleventh season's premiere.

Just like the last three seasons' competition, ANW hosts Matt Iseman and Akbar Gbaja-Biamila, along with Kristine Leahy, chose their all-star teams consisting of two male veterans and one female veteran. Two-time winner Team Kristine (gray/pink), focused on young all-stars: Mathis "Kid" Owhadi, Tyler Gillett, and Barclay Stockett. Team Matt (blue) reached out on the same team that just missed out on winning last season: Jamie Rahn, Lance Pekus, and Jesse "Flex" LaBreck. Team Akbar (red) featured: Grant McCartney, Meagan Martin, and Jake Murray. Next came the skills competition on a supersized course, where contestants tested their skills in competition on the 80-foot tall Mega Spider Climb, Wicked Wingnuts, an upper body test on the Dual Doorknob Drop, a side-by-side race on the Striding Steps, 4-story Super Salmon Ladder, and a fun new obstacle, the Big Dipper Freestyle.

2020
The fifth all-stars (skills challenge) special aired on August 31, 2020, on NBC, a week before the start of the twelfth season's premiere. Like previous seasons' competition, ANW hosts Matt Iseman and Akbar Gbaja-Biamila returned, this time with Zuri Hall as the sideline reporter picking her first team this year, as well as competitions on a supersized course that tested their skills in competitions, which consisted of the Fearsome Ferris Wheel, Striding Steps, Mega Spider Climb, Big Dipper Freestyle. They chose their all-star teams consisting of two male veterans and one female veteran. Team Matt (blue): Karsten Williams, Ryan Stratis, and Michelle Warnky. Team Akbar (red): Grant McCartney, Jake Murray, and Allyssa Beird. Team Zuri (yellow), like herself, Zuri chose a team of rookies: David Wright, Seth Rogers, and Mady Howard. However, some of the skills competition that featured Drew Drechsel as one of the competitors were not shown in the special, due to US current legal proceedings.

2022
The sixth All-Stars Special aired on May 30, 2022 on NBC and was renamed All Star Spectacular, a week before the start of the fourteenth season's premiere. Like previous seasons' competition, ANW hosts Matt Iseman and Akbar Gbaja-Biamila returned, alongside Zuri Hall as the sideline reporter. This also marks the return of the format after missing out during post twelfth season, due to the various changes in format as a result of the COVID-19 pandemic. There were some competitions on a supersized course, which consisted of the Spring Forward Tag, Cat Grab, Big Dipper Freestyle and Striding Steps. Compared to previous tournaments, there was no Team Competition to set.

Women's Championship
A special, American Ninja Warrior Women's Championship aired on May 9, 2021, on NBC at 7:00pm EDT. It featured 12 female competitors that battled through three rounds. In Round 1, all 12 women will face a six-obstacle course. The top 6 women will advance to Round 2, the extended ten-obstacle course. The top four women will advance to race head-to-head on the Power Tower. The winner takes home $50,000 and becomes the ANW female champion.

ANW Women's Champion 2021: Meagan MartinANW Women's Champion 2022: Jesse Labreck

Reception

Awards and nominations

Creative Arts Emmy Awards

Directors Guild of America Awards

Nickelodeon Kids' Choice Awards

People's Choice Awards

Primetime Emmy Awards

Producers Guild of America Awards

Ratings

International broadcasts
In Australia and New Zealand, the show is broadcast on SBS2 (2013–2017), 9Go! (2018–present), TV3 and Four. On April 25, 2016, it was announced that Canadian broadcaster CTV picked up American Ninja Warrior for its 2016 summer broadcast schedule. In the United Kingdom and Ireland, the show is broadcast on Challenge and more recently on Sky Two. In Israel, the show is broadcast on Yes Action with the American version, and on Keshet 12 with its own version. In 2016, Croatian RTL started broadcasting the show. The show is also shown in Finland on Sub-TV. In the Netherlands the show was first broadcast in 2017 on SBS 6, where their own Ninja Warrior NL has been broadcast. In Norway it is broadcast on TV2 Zebra. The show also airs in South Africa, on SABC 3, airing Sunday afternoons 13:30.

Syndication
The show is in syndication markets throughout the US and airs on local broadcast channels. At one point syndicated episodes were airing on MTV2 on Saturdays in August 2018. On August 12, 2019, the series began airing reruns on Nickelodeon. However, after airing just 10 episodes, the series was abruptly pulled from Nick's schedule after August 23, 2019.

Spin-offs

Ninja vs. Ninja

On October 9, 2015, Esquire Network announced a spin-off of American Ninja Warrior, which would feature 24 three-person teams (two men and one woman) of popular ANW alumni, initially titled Team Ninja Warrior. The teams compete head-to-head against each other, running the course simultaneously, thus creating a new live duel dynamic (including crossing points, where the two competitors can affect the other's progress.) The two teams with the fastest times advance to the finale, where one team will be crowned the winner and receive a cash prize. Matt Iseman and Akbar Gbaja-Biamila host alongside actor and journalist, Alex Curry. The series is Esquire Network's most-watched program in the channel's history.

On May 31, 2016, Esquire Network ordered a sixteen-episode second season that also included a five-episode special college edition that had college-aged competitors go head-to-head against rival schools. On March 6, 2017, it was announced that Team Ninja Warrior will be moving to sibling cable channel USA Network as Esquire Network winds down its linear channel operations and relaunches as an online only service. The show's second season premiered proper on April 18. Ahead of its third season, the show was also re-titled American Ninja Warrior: Ninja vs. Ninja.

American Ninja Warrior Junior

On May 2, 2018, the second spin-off of American Ninja Warrior—entitled American Ninja Warrior Junior— was announced. Premiered on Universal Kids on October 13, 2018, Matt Iseman and Akbar Gbaja-Biamila reprised their roles from ANW as hosts, with Olympic 2016 gold medalist Elijah Browning joining as co-host, guiding competitors in head-to-head challenges. The series will feature 142 kids ages 9–14 competing along a course of miniature ANW obstacles such as the Sky hooks. Similar to ANW, males and females will run along the same course, and similarly to Ninja vs. Ninja and College Madness, competitors compete head-to-head. However, they will be divided into three age groups: 9–10, 11–12 and 13–14, with each category coached by fan-favorite athletes: Korey Kade, Lucas Gomes, Calle Alexander, Caleb Bergie, Danny Bergie, and Natalie Duran. In May 2021, it was announced that the third season would be moving to Peacock.

 Video game 

A sports video game based on the series, American Ninja Warrior: Challenge, was released exclusively in North America on March 19, 2019 for PlayStation 4, Xbox One, and Nintendo Switch. It was developed by Gaming Corps Austin and published by GameMill Entertainment. The Career mode is the main mode of the game, and much like in real life, it centers around the idea of picking and training on various obstacles, participating in skills competitions, and competing in the 6 different rounds of American Ninja Warrior. The 6 rounds are the Qualifiers, the City Finals, and the 4 stages of Mount Midoriyama, Stage 1, Stage 2, Stage 3, and Stage 4, just like on the TV show that it is inspired by. Its Quick Play mode allows up to 4 players to compete on predetermined obstacle courses.

See also

Notes

References

External links

 
 Casting site
 

 
Sasuke (TV series)
Ninja Warrior (franchise)
2000s American game shows
2010s American game shows
2020s American game shows
2009 American television series debuts
American television spin-offs
Japan in non-Japanese culture
Television shows featuring audio description
Television shows adapted into video games